The 1896 South Australian Football Association season was the 20th season of the top-level Australian rules football competition in South Australia.

During the 1896 season a rule was introduced for North Adelaide and the Natives (renamed West Torrens for the 1897 season) allowing them to field an extra three players to be more competitive with the three more established clubs. The Native team played the majority of their games at Kensington despite many of their players living in the Port area.|

Ladder

Note – North Adelaide and Natives forfeited to South Adelaide once each.

References

SANFL
South Australian National Football League seasons